This page is a list of French education ministers.

A governmental position overseeing public education was first created in France in 1802.  Following the various regime changes in France in the first decades of the 19th century, the position changed official status and name a number of times before the position of Minister of Public Instruction was created in 1828.  For much of its history, the position was combined with that of Minister of Public Worship, who dealt with issues related to the Roman Catholic Church, except in instances where the Minister of Public Instruction was a Protestant.  The position has also occasionally been combined with Minister of Sports and Minister of Youth Affairs.  In 1932, the office's title was changed to Minister of National Education, although it was briefly changed back in 1940–1941, and was renamed Minister of Education during the Presidency of Valéry Giscard d'Estaing (1974–1981).

Administrators (various titles) of Public Instruction or the University, 1802–1828

Ministers of Public Instruction, 1828–1932

Ministers of National Education, 1932–present

Education in France
Education